Monroe William Smith, a former Boy Scout executive, and his wife Isabel Bacheler Smith, art teacher, founded American Youth Hostels as a young couple, in 1934, in Northfield, Massachusetts. Monroe also founded Youth Argosy, an organization intended to "provide travel opportunities for worthy young people of slender means" and resigned his directorship of American Youth Hostels in 1949 to devote time to Youth Argosy.  After a promising start, Youth Argosy went bankrupt in 1951, largely due to a new Civil Aeronautics Board regulation aimed at small charter groups.

Monroe attended the Mount Hermon School for boys in 1919. After graduation, he became a Massachusetts school teacher and boy scout leader. During a scout trip to Europe, Monroe and Isabel met Richard Schirrmann and learned about his German Hostelling Organization. They later attended the second International Hosteling Meeting in 1933 and brought the idea of hosteling back to the United States, where the American Hostelling International movement was born.

Monroe was born on January 22, 1901, in Sunderland, Massachusetts, and died on December 8, 1972, in Delray Beach, Florida. Isabel was born on December 12, 1898, in Hartford, Connecticut, and died on May 3, 1985, in Boulder, Colorado. They had three children, Elizabeth, Steve, and Jonathan.

References

External links
 American Hostelling International

Youth hostelling
Northfield Mount Hermon School alumni